Johannes Age "Joop" Bakker (27 May 1921 – 3 October 2003) was a Dutch politician of the defunct Anti-Revolutionary Party (ARP) now merged into the Christian Democratic Appeal (CDA) party and businessman.

Bakker applied at the Rotterdam School of Economics in June 1941 majoring in Economics during the German occupation Bakker continued his study and obtaining a Bachelor of Economics degree in February 1943 but in April 1943 the German occupation authority closed the Rotterdam School of Economics. Following the end of World War II Bakker returned to the Rotterdam School of Economics before graduating with a Master of Economics degree in July 1949. Bakker served on the Municipal Council of Bolsward from September 1945 until January 1955 and served as an Alderman in Bolsward from June 1946 until January 1955. Bakker worked as a corporate director for the manufacturing company J.A. Bakker en Zoon in Bolsward from July 1949 until January 1955. In December 1954 Bakker was nominated as Mayor of Andijk, taking office on 1 January 1955. In March 1959 Bakker was nominated as Mayor of Hoogeveen, he resigned as Mayor of Andijk the same day he took office as Mayor of Hoogeveen. taking office on 30 April 1959. After the election of 1963 Bakker was appointed as State Secretary for Economic Affairs in the Cabinet Marijnen, taking office on 3 September 1963. The Cabinet Marijnen fell on 27 February 1965 and continued to serve in a demissionary capacity until the cabinet formation of 1965 when it was replaced by the Cabinet Cals with Bakker continuing as State Secretary for Economic Affairs, taking office on 14 April 1965. The Cabinet Cals fell just one year later on 14 October 1966 and continued to serve in a demissionary capacity until it was replaced by the caretaker Cabinet Zijlstra with Bakker appointed as Minister of Economic Affairs, taking office on 22 November 1966. After the election of 1967 Bakker was appointed as Deputy Prime Minister, Minister of Transport and Water Management and Minister for Suriname and Netherlands Antilles Affairs in the Cabinet De Jong, taking office on 5 April 1967. Bakker was elected as a Member of the House of Representatives after the election of 1971, taking office on 11 May 1971. Following the cabinet formation of 1971 Bakker was not giving a cabinet post in the new cabinet, the Cabinet De Jong was replaced by the Cabinet Biesheuvel I on 6 July 1971 and he continued to serve in the House of Representatives as a backbencher.

In January 1971 Bakker was nominated as CEO and Chairman of the Board of directors of Ago Insurance, he resigned as a Member of the House of Representatives the same day he became CEO and Chairman of Ago Insurance serving from 15 February 1972 until 1 January 1983. On December 1982 Ago Insurance and Ennia N.V. choose to merge to form the Aegon N.V. with Bakker appointed as CEO and Chairman of the Board of directors serving from 1 January 1983 until 1 January 1984. Bakker also became active in the private sector and public sector and occupied numerous seats as a corporate director and nonprofit director on several boards of directors and supervisory boards (ING Group, Zilveren Kruis) and served on several state commissions and councils on behalf of the government (Staatsbosbeheer, Netherlands Cadastre Agency, National Insurance Bank and Public Pension Funds PFZW) and as an diplomat and lobbyist for several economic delegations on behalf of the government. Bakker later served as Chairman of the Supervisory board of the DSM Company from 1 May 1984 until 1 July 1988.

Bakker was known for his abilities as a manager and negotiator. Bakker continued to comment on political affairs until his death at the age of 83.

Decorations

References

External links

  Drs. J.A. (Joop) Bakker Parlement & Politiek

 

 

 

 

 

1921 births
2003 deaths
Anti-Revolutionary Party politicians
Commanders of the Order of the Netherlands Lion
Deputy Prime Ministers of the Netherlands
Dutch chief executives in the finance industry
Dutch chief executives in the manufacturing industry
Dutch company founders
Dutch corporate directors
Dutch lobbyists
Dutch nonprofit directors
Dutch nonprofit executives
Dutch people of World War II
Grand Officers of the Order of Leopold II
Grand Officers of the Order of Orange-Nassau
Knights Commander of the Order of Merit of the Federal Republic of Germany
Mayors in North Holland
People from Andijk
Mayors in Drenthe
People from Hoogeveen
Members of the House of Representatives (Netherlands)
Ministers of Economic Affairs of the Netherlands
Ministers of Kingdom Relations of the Netherlands
Ministers of Transport and Water Management of the Netherlands
Municipal councillors in Friesland
People from Bolsward
People from Wassenaar
Reformed Churches Christians from the Netherlands
State Secretaries for Economic Affairs of the Netherlands
20th-century Dutch businesspeople
20th-century Dutch civil servants
20th-century Dutch economists
20th-century Dutch politicians